Marvel Comics Presents was an American comic book anthology series published by Marvel Comics originally from 1988 to 1995. It returned for a second volume in 2007–2008, and a third volume that started in 2019.

Volume 1
The first volume was released on a bi-weekly basis and lasted for 175 issues. Each issue had four eight-page stories, of which generally two were episodes in ongoing serials and two were one-part stories. The one-part stories generally featured obscure or little-seen characters from the Marvel Universe, and often featured work by creators previously unpublished in the comics field, including Scott Lobdell (a later X-Men writer), who started work under the editorship of Tom DeFalco.

The original plan was for the lead story to feature different members of the X-Men in solo adventures lasting between eight and ten episodes.  The first ten issues featured Wolverine; others featured were Colossus, Cyclops, Havok, and Excalibur. From issues #38 through #142, Wolverine was the featured character of the series. Particularly notable during this run was "Weapon X" in issues #72–84, which revealed the origin of how Wolverine received his adamantium skeleton, with story and art by Barry Windsor-Smith. Wolverine returned for one more featured run in the series from issues #150 through #155.

Later, the Ghost Rider was added to the series as a "co-lead" feature, and the book adopted a "flip-book" format, thereby allowing each of the two characters cover billing. Over time, other characters, such as Man-Thing, Falcon, Black Panther, Lunatik, and the New Warriors received cover billing as well.

Several of the Wolverine storylines have since been collected and reprinted in trade paperback format. The first volume features Wolverine's first adventures in Madripoor, a fictional island that became Wolverine's second home during the late 1980s, as well as the "introduction" of Tyger Tiger.

Other notable highlights include the first appearance of Ramonda, mother to Shuri and step-mother to T'Challa (issue #14), the first appearance of Damage Control (issue #19), a wrestling match between the Hulk and a Hulk Hogan facsimile (issue #45), the first appearance of Siege (issue #62), the first appearance of Cyber (issue #85, by Peter David and Sam Kieth), and the first ever meeting of Wolverine and Venom (issue #117).

Stories In Volume 1

Volume 2
In 2007 the anthology series returned, also including work by creators previously unpublished in the comics field. The series' editors were Warren Simons, Nick Lowe, Andy Schmidt, and John Barber. The series hosted two 12-part stories (The Vanguard super-team and Weapon Omega) and a host of short one-part to five-part stories involving a variety of characters within the Marvel Universe. The series was cancelled with issue #12.

Stories in Volume 2

Volume 3
In 2019, the anthology series returned.

Stories in Volume 3

Bibliography
Marvel Comics Presents vol. 1 #1–175
Marvel Comics Presents vol. 2 #1–12

Collected editions
Wolverine: Save the Tiger!/Marvel Comics Presents Wolverine Vol. 1 (vol. 1) #1–10
The Man-Thing by Steve Gerber Vol. 3 (vol. 1) #1-12
Shang-Chi, Master of Kung-Fu Omnibus Vol. 4 (vol. 1) #1–8
Colossus: God's Country (vol. 1) #10–17
Black Panther: Panther's Quest (vol. 1) #13–37
Speedball Classic (vol. 1) #14, 56
Cyclops: Retribution (vol. 1) #17–24
The Sensational She-Hulk by John Byrne (vol. 1) #18
Incredible Hulk by Peter David Omnibus Vol. 1 (vol. 1) #26
Excalibur Epic Collection: The Sword is Drawn (vol. 1) #31–38
Marvel Comics Presents Wolverine Vol. 2 (vol. 1) #39–50
Hercules: Full Circle (vol. 1) #39-41
Incredible Hulk by Peter David Omnibus Vol. 1 (vol. 1) #45
Silver Surfer Epic Collection: Thanos Quest (vol. 1) #50
Marvel Comics Presents Wolverine Vol. 3 (vol. 1) #51–61
Avengers: Scarlet Witch (vol. 1) #60-63, 143-144
Marvel Comics Presents Wolverine Vol. 4 (vol. 1) #62–71
Wolverine and Ghost Rider in Acts of Vengeance (vol. 1) #64–70
Silver Surfer Epic Collection: The Infinity Gauntlet (vol. 1) #69, 93–97
Wolverine: Weapon X (vol. 1) #72–84
Excalibur Epic Collection: Girls' School From Heck (vol. 1) #75
X-Men Origins: Firestar (vol. 1) #82-87
Wolverine: Blood Hungry (vol. 1) #85–92
Wolverine: Prehistory (vol. 1) #93–98
Infinity War (vol. 1) #108-111
Wolverine: Typhoid's Kiss (vol. 1) #109–116
Daredevil: Typhoid's Kiss (vol. 1) #109–116, 123–130, 150–151
Iron Fist: Book of Changes (vol. 1) #111, 113–118, 125–137, 140–141
Wolverine vs. the Marvel Universe (vol. 1) #117–122
Avengers: Hawkeye - Earth's Mightiest Marksman (vol. 1) #159-161
War Machine/The Invincible Iron Man: Hands of the Mandarin (vol. 1) #169-172
Patsy Walker: Hellcat (vol. 2) #1–4
Marvel Comics Presents Weapon Omega (vol. 2) #1–12

See also
 DC Comics Presents

References

External links
Newsarama article about the return of the anthology series
MCP vol 1 covers

1988 comics debuts
1995 comics endings
2007 comics debuts 
2008 comics endings
Marvel Comics titles
Comics anthologies
Comics by Chris Claremont
Comics by Don McGregor
Comics by Doug Moench
Comics by Fabian Nicieza
Comics by Gerry Conway
Comics by Len Wein
Comics by Marv Wolfman
Comics by Steve Gerber